The Whisper family of firearm cartridges is a group of wildcat cartridges developed in the early 1990s by J.D. Jones of SSK Industries. The Whisper Family was developed as a line of accurate, multi-purpose cartridges using relatively heavy rifle bullets for a given caliber in subsonic loads. The intention was to create an extremely accurate cartridge family for military, police, competition and specialized hunting markets that could also be easily sound suppressed.

While all cartridges in the Whisper family must be capable of accuracy using subsonic loads, most of the smaller caliber cartridges of the family (.308" and under) are also capable of being loaded to supersonic velocities using relatively lightweight bullets for their caliber, increasing their utility.

Subsonic cartridges 
A subsonic cartridge is designed to fire its bullets at velocities slower than the speed of sound (1128 ft/s at 70 °F) to avoid the sonic crack caused by the bullet breaking the sound barrier. This allows the cartridge to be sound suppressed relatively easily. Additionally, in some cases, subsonic loads are often intended to avoid the turbulent transonic zone entirely, maximizing potential accuracy.

Thumper concept 
The Whisper rounds exceeding a caliber of .45 in (11.6mm) are in accordance with the Thumper concept popularized by Jeff Cooper.

Whisper cartridge cases 

Yet another consideration of the Whisper Family design is that all of the cartridges are based on existing cases that utilize common case head dimensions. This allows rifles with common bolt face dimensions to be converted to a Whisper cartridge fairly easily, often requiring only the rifle's action to be re-barreled. There are four "series" within the Whisper Family, each using a different parent case.

The .221 Fireball case shares the same case head dimensions (0.375"/ 9.53mm) as the commercial .223 Remington and military 5.56×45mm cartridges.
The 7mm Remington Bench Rest case shares the same case head dimensions (0.470"/ 11.94mm) as the commercial .308 Winchester (as well as other cartridges based on that case; .243 Winchester, .260 Remington, 7mm-08 Remington, etc.) and military 7.62×51 NATO cartridges.
The .338 Lapua Magnum case also has a fairly unusual case head diameter (0.590"/ 14.99mm). However, the vast majority of rifles chambered for the .338 Lapua Magnum are bolt actions and as such can be chambered in .510 Whisper via a relatively simple re-barrelling. As the manufacture of .338 Lapua Magnum ammunition would appear to be going nowhere but up (due to several militaries adopting it for their sniper rifles), this may be a reason behind the development of a Whisper cartridge based on its case—more available and more economical brass. The .338 Lapua Magnum case by itself has been based on the .416 Rigby.
The .460 Weatherby Magnum has a case head diameter (0.580"/ 14,73mm) unique to the large Weatherby belted magnum cases. Few other cartridges use this case head size (or something close, like the .416 Rigby). This tends to mean that rifles capable of being converted are somewhat less available or are based on expensive custom actions. Also, cases for forming tend to be very expensive. The .460 Weatherby Magnum case by itself has been based on the .378 Weatherby Magnum.

Mini and Micro Whispers 
There are also two little-known cartridges of the Whisper Family based on handgun cartridge cases. These are the 7.62 Micro Whisper, based on the .30 Luger case; and the 7.63 Mini-Whisper, based on the .30 Mauser case. Like the rest of the Whisper Family, these two cartridges are designed to fire rifle bullets at subsonic velocities.

Trademark 
SSK Industries has a registration for the wordmark "Whisper" (reg. no. 1898840) in class 13 (ammunition). In order to sidestep this branding and/or avoid licensing fees required to use the "Whisper" name legally, other manufacturers tend to use different names for cartridges in the Whisper family. For example, the .300 Whisper, the most popular cartridge of the family, is often called .300 AAC Blackout, ".300 AAC", ".300 Fireball", ".300 warrior carbine", or ".300-221".

See also 
 .300 AAC Blackout
 8.6 Blackout
 12.7×55mm STs-130

References

External links
SSK Industries

Cartridge families
Wildcat cartridges